Season 1874–75 in Scottish football saw the Scottish Cup being contested for the second time.

Overview

After its successful introduction the previous season, the Scottish Cup was again competed for, with Queen's Park once again lifting the trophy. For the second season running, Queen's contented themselves with the domestic tournament, declining to enter the FA Cup.

International competition was once again restricted to the annual clash with England, while the Glasgow v Sheffield representative fixture was played in Scotland for the first time.

Scottish Cup

There was a modest expansion in the competition in its second season, which attracted 25 entrants – up from 16 for the previous season. There was geographic expansion too, with the 3rd Edinburgh Rifle Volunteers team becoming the first team from the east of the country to participate.

Holders Queen's Park once again lifted the trophy, defeating Western and West End in the early rounds, then progressing to the semi-finals when opponents Rovers withdrew. The semi-final, against the previous season's runners-up, Clydesdale, took three games to settle with Queen's finally winning 1–0 at Kinning Park following 0–0 and 2–2 draws. Renton, meanwhile had defeated their local rivals Dumbarton in their own replayed tie.

The final saw Queen's Park comfortably run out 3–0 winners. The crowd, estimated at 7,000, reflected the growing interest in football as it was almost three times the number that had attended the previous year.

Scotland national team

The 1875 international saw Scotland visiting London for a second time, on this occasion returning with a draw.

Representative matches

27 February 1875:  Glasgow 2  Sheffield 0 (Hamilton Crescent, Partick)

Notes and references

 
Seasons in Scottish football